Harrison is a neighborhood in the Near North community in the U.S. city of Minneapolis, located to the west of downtown. Its boundaries are roughly, Olson Memorial Highway to the north, Lyndale Avenue to the east, Bassett Creek to the south, and Theodore Wirth Park to the west.

History 
The Harrison Neighborhood area began forming as an identifiable urban neighborhood in the late 1800s and early 1900s, many residents were Finnish Americans. From approximately 1900 to 1960 much of the Harrison Neighborhood area was informally and widely known as the 'Finn Town' of the Minneapolis St. Paul vicinity[5]. From around the 1960s, Harrison began to lose its Finnish identity and gradually evolved into a very multi-racial and multi-ethnic neighborhood.

In the 1970s, American recording artist Prince lived as a child in two homes within the Harrison Neighborhood, at 1707 Glenwood Avenue and 539 Newton Avenue North. Sources vary as to the dates that he resided at these addresses. Prince lived with his father at 1707 Glenwood Avenue (apartment 105) around 1970 to 1972[4]. He also lived with his father at 539 Newton Avenue North around 1972 to 1974[4]. Prince continued to visit his father at this house in Harrison well into his career as an internationally acclaimed musician. Prince Rogers Nelson was listed on county records as the property owner at the time of Prince's death.

References

  4. Gabler, Jay. "Prince’s childhood homes: MnDOT research helps create a timeline" https://blog.thecurrent.org/2016/09/princes-childhood-homes-mndot-research-helps-create-a-timeline Sept. 30, 2016 (retrieved 2018-May-05)
  5. Wargelin, K. Marianne. "Finntown, Minneapolis - An American Neighborhood" http://digitalcollections.hclib.org/digital/collection/p17208coll13/id/6345 Hennepin History magazine, Fall 1988 (retrieved 2018-May-05)

External links
Minneapolis Neighborhood Profile - Harrison
Harrison Neighborhood Association

Neighborhoods in Minneapolis